Contemporary Amperex Technology Co. Limited, abbreviated as CATL, is a Chinese battery manufacturer and technology company founded in 2011 that specializes in the manufacturing of lithium-ion batteries for electric vehicles and energy storage systems, as well as battery management systems (BMS). With a market share of 32.6% in 2021, CATL is the biggest lithium-ion battery manufacturer for EVs in the world, producing 96.7 GWh of the global 296.8 GWh, up 167.5% year on year. The company plans to have a manufacturing capacity target of more than 500 GWh by 2025 and more than 800 GWh by 2030.

It is headquartered in Ningde, Fujian and operates manufacturing bases in Ningde, Fujian province; Xining, Qinghai; Liyang, Jiangsu; Yibin, Sichuan; Zhaoqing, Guangdong and in its first overseas plant located in Erfurt, Germany. Its four main R&D centers are based in Ningde, Fujian; Liyang, Jiangsu; Shanghai and Munich, Germany.

History 
CATL was founded in Ningde, which is reflected in its Chinese name ('Ningde era'). The company started as a spin-off of Amperex Technology Limited (ATL), a previous business founded by Robin Zeng in 1999. ATL initially manufactured lithium-polymer batteries based on licensed technology, but later developed more reliable battery designs themselves. In 2005 ATL was acquired by Japan's TDK company, but Zeng continued as a manager for ATL. In 2012, Zeng and vice-chairman Huang Shilin spun-off the EV battery operations of ATL into the new company CATL. Until 2015, former parent TDK held a 15% stake in CATL.

Zeng has applied management styles of TDK and Huawei to his company.

Growth

China's battery sector, led by CATL, has decoupled from the monopoly of western technology due to China's supremacy in the supply of rare earth elements essential in batteries, accounting for more than 40% of the world's collection. It has joined Tesla's battery supply chain and the supply chains of European and American vehicle manufacturers, in addition to defeating Panasonic of Japan and L.G. Chemical of South Korea. As a result, CATL leads the globe in power batteries with a 33 percent market share, and the United States will have difficulty catching up with CATL.

In 2016, CATL was the world's third largest provider of EV, HEV and PHEV batteries behind Panasonic (Sanyo) and BYD. In 2017, CATL's sales of power battery system reached 11.84GWh, taking the sales championship worldwide for the first time.

In 2018, it was announced that CATL would establish a new battery factory in Arnstadt, Thuringia, Germany. CATL's annual sales volume amounted to 21.18 GWh of energy storage capacity in 2018.

As the Chinese government started to phase out subsidies for EVs towards 2020, CATL sought to diversify its revenue overseas. According to SNE Research, in the year of 2020, CATL's EV battery consumption volume ranks No.1 in the world for four consecutive years. In June 2020, CATL's founder Zeng Yuqun announced that the company had achieved a battery for electric vehicles (EVs) rated as good for 1 million miles (or 1.6 million kilometers) and was waiting to receive orders.
In 2021, CATL is now the largest maker of mid- to large-sized batteries for electric vehicles.
In the first half of 2022, CATL is ranked first in the world with a market share of 34 percent according to SNE research.

In 2022, it was announced that CATL would establish a new battery factory in Debrecen, Hungary.

Competition 
In March 2022, 36Kr reported that EV makers in China have been decreasing their order sizes with CATL. Nio sought additional battery suppliers after a four-year exclusive partnership with CATL. GAC Group also began to place orders from China Aviation Lithium Battery (CALB), a direct competitor of CATL. CALB is known for lithium iron phosphate batteries, which were considered inferior to CATL's ternary lithium batteries due to the latter's longer battery life. This changed in 2019, when multiple GAC Aion S vehicles caught fire due to poor thermal stability of CATL's power cells, which were used for the range. In comparison, CALB's lithium iron phosphate batteries do not release oxygen when they generate electric power, making them less likely to catch fire. CALB has since sought to compete with CATL on the basis of battery safety, releasing a new product in September 2021 with an ultra-thin casing, 25% fewer components, and 40% lighter in weight.

Partnerships 
Due to its main competitor BYD Company prioritizing battery supply to its own vehicles, CATL was able to capture partnerships with foreign automakers. CATL's battery technology is currently used by electric vehicle manufacturers in the international market, and CATL collaborates with companies including BMW, Daimler AG, Hyundai, Honda, Li Auto, NIO, PSA, Tesla, Toyota, Volkswagen, Volvo and XPeng. In China, its clients include BAIC Motor, Geely, GAC Group, Yutong Bus, Zhongtong Bus, Xiamen King Long, SAIC Motor and Foton Motor.

In January 2017, CATL announced its plans to enter into a strategic partnership with Valmet Automotive, focusing its collaboration on project management, engineering and battery pack supply for EV and HEV. As part of the partnership, CATL acquired a 22% stake in Valmet Automotive.

BMW announced in 2018 that it would buy €4 billion worth of batteries from CATL for use in the electric Mini and iNext vehicles.

In July 2022, Ford announced buying batteries from CATL for use in the Ford Mustang Mach-E and Ford F-150 Lightning models.

In October 2022, CATL expands deal with Vinfast to provide skateboard chassis for EVs and ‘enhance global footprint’

Technology 
According to former Tesla battery supply chain manager Vivas Kumar, CATL "are seen as the leaders of lithium iron phosphate battery technology". The company employs  the cell-to-pack method to reduce the amount of inactive weight of its batteries. It increases volume utilization rate by 15% to 20%, doubles the production efficiency and reduces the number of parts for a battery pack by 40%, while the energy density of a battery pack jumps 140–150 Wh/Kg to 200 Wh/Kg.

According to Kumar, unlike competitors such as LG Chem or SK Innovation, CATL is more willing to adapt outside technology, as opposed to applying a full in-house design.

In 2021 the company unveiled a sodium-ion battery for the automotive market. A battery recycling facility is planned to recover some of the materials.

According to 36Kr, CATL prioritizes cost and operational efficiency over innovation for new products and production techniques. In production, standardization helps CATL reduce wastage, stabilize quality of products, and offer cheaper replacements for end users, but also restricts the company's ability to develop products for clients to match their designs.

References

External links 
 

 Contemporary Amperex Technology Ltd. (CATL) on LinkedIn
 

Battery manufacturers
Auto parts suppliers of China
Companies based in Fujian
Chinese companies established in 2011
Electronics companies established in 2011
Chinese brands
Electric vehicle battery manufacturers
Ningde